Union Day may refer to:
 "Great Union Day" on December 1, also known as "Unification Day", the national holiday of Romania
 "Union Day" on February 12 in Myanmar, commemorating the anniversary of the Panglong Agreement in 1947
 "Union Day" on April 26 in Tanzania, commemorating the unification of Zanzibar and Tanganyika in 1964

See also
 Unification Day (disambiguation)